To is an unclassified Mbum language of northern Cameroon and the Central African Republic. It is only used as a second language, as the secret male initiation language of the Gbaya.

References

Languages of Cameroon
Mbum languages
Initiation languages
Unclassified languages of Africa